Jacob Rolsdorph Andersen (1828–1901) was a Norwegian judge.

He was born in Eidskog, and graduated as cand.jur. in 1852. He worked as an attorney in Grue from 1856, assessor in Christiania City Court from 1874 and district stipendiary magistrate of Vinger and Odal District Court from 1880. From 1890 to 1901 he was a Supreme Court Assessor. He died in 1901.

References

1828 births
1901 deaths
People from Eidskog
Supreme Court of Norway justices
19th-century Norwegian judges